Noto is a font family comprising over 100 individual fonts, which are together designed to cover all the scripts encoded in the Unicode standard. , Noto fonts cover all 93 scripts defined in Unicode version 6.1 (April 2012), although fewer than 30,000 of the nearly 75,000 CJK unified ideographs in version 6.0 are covered. In total, Noto fonts cover nearly 64,000 characters, which is under half of the 149,186 characters defined in Unicode 15.0 (released in September 2022).

The Noto family is designed with the goal of achieving visual harmony (e.g., compatible heights and stroke thicknesses) across multiple languages/scripts. Commissioned by Google, the font is licensed under the SIL Open Font License. Until September 2015, the fonts were under the Apache License 2.0.

Etymology 
When text is rendered by a computer, sometimes characters are displayed as substitute characters (typically small rectangles). They represent the characters that cannot be displayed because no font with the necessary characters is installed on the computer, and have sometimes been called by the slang name tofu because of their visual similarity to the food of the same name.

Google's aim for Noto (whose name is derived from no tofu) is to remove this kind of 'tofu' from the Web.

Characteristics

Emoji

The Noto Emoji Project provides color and black-and-white emoji fonts. The color version is used on the Gmail, Google Chat, Google Meet, Google Hangouts, and YouTube web apps, as well as the Android, Wear OS, and ChromeOS operating systems. It is also used on the Slack apps on Windows, Linux, and Android.

Latin, Greek and Cyrillic
Noto Sans and Noto Serif contain Latin, Greek and Cyrillic glyphs. Noto Sans is based on Droid Sans and Open Sans, while Noto Serif is based on Droid Serif. They are designed by Steve Matteson.

Noto Sans includes an ambiguous lowercase l.

Noto Sans displays "U+10f LATIN SMALL LETTER D WITH CARON" (ď) like d+apostrophe, no caron visible.

CJK

Noto CJK fonts are rebranded versions of Adobe Source Han fonts, developed by Adobe and Google which contains Chinese characters, Hangul and Kana; Latin-script letters and numerals are taken from the Source Pro fonts.

In addition to the standard distributions, Ken Lunde of Adobe maintains a "Super" OpenType Collection (OTC) version that provides the families under two names at once. Since OTCs reuse existing glyphs, such a file containing both Noto and Source fonts is only 200KB larger than one containing only Source fonts.

Coverage

 there are 195 Noto fonts, of which 156 are sans-serif style, 29 are serif style, and the remaining 10 fonts are not classified as serif or sans-serif. The Noto Color Emoji font only works under Android and Linux, and cannot be installed under macOS or Microsoft Windows.

The Noto fonts cover 150 out of the 154 scripts defined in Unicode version 13.0 (released in March 2020), as well as various syllables and emoji which do not belong to a specific script. 

As of October 2016, all scripts encoded up to Unicode version 6.0 (released October 2010) were covered by Noto fonts, although not all characters defined in Unicode version 6.0 were covered. In particular, only about 30,000 of the 74,616 CJK unified ideographs defined in Unicode version 6.0 were covered by Noto fonts. None of the 53 scripts and 1 block encoded between Unicode versions 6.1 and 11.0 were covered by Noto fonts, although some symbols, emoji, and characters added to existing scripts after version 6.0 were covered. It is a design goal for 'Phase 3' to cover all characters in Unicode version 9.0 except for most of CJK unified ideographs outside the Basic Multilingual Plane.

The Noto Sans Symbols fonts include a large variety of symbols, including alchemical signs, dingbats, numbers and letters enclosed in circles for lists, playing cards, domino and Mahjong tiles, chess piece icons, Greek, Byzantine and regular musical symbols and arrow symbols. Among mathematical symbols, it includes blackboard bold glyphs, a mathematical sans-serif font modeled on Helvetica, Fraktur and script fonts, hexagrams, and Aegean numerals.

As of April 2021, the Noto fonts in the GitHub repository have this coverage of Unicode 13:

List of Noto fonts

Usage
Some projects provide a package for installing Noto fonts, e.g. Debian, Arch Linux, Fedora Linux, Gentoo Linux, CTAN. Since version 6.0, LibreOffice bundles Noto.

Since 2019, Noto IKEA, a customised version of Noto Sans, is a corporate typeface of IKEA. It is used in pair with standard versions of Noto Sans and they replaced Verdana as a corporate typeface.

References

External links

 
 noto-fonts, noto-fonts-alpha, noto-cjk, noto-emoji, noto-source  – GitHub repositories

Unified serif and sans-serif typeface families
Free software Unicode typefaces
Software using the Apache license
2013 introductions
IPA typefaces
Latin-script typefaces
Cyrillic typefaces
Greek typefaces 
CJK typefaces